Elfonda Mekel, SH, (born 21 May 1970), better known by his stage name Once Mekel (pronounced Ohn-chè), is an Indonesian singer and former lead vocalist of Dewa 19.

Biography
Once was born Elfonda Mekel in Ujung Pandang, South Sulawesi, on 21 May 1970. He began singing while attending junior high school at Tirta Marta Junior High School; he also learned how to play the drums, piano, and guitar. He eventually began participating in singing competitions, including an inter-high school competition in Jakarta.

After graduating from Tirta Mirta Senior High School, Once joined numerous bands. His first bands, Brawijaya and Dimensi, were cover bands. After joining Java Burns, he began singing songs he had written himself; he eventually provided a song for the compilation album Seribu Angan (A Thousand Dreams) in the early 1990s.

Due to a problem with his voice box, Once took a hiatus from singing between 1993 and 1997. He used this time to study law at the University of Indonesia, graduating in 1996. He also worked for a construction company.

By 1997 he had begun singing again, in cafes, and in 1998 he recorded the soundtrack for the film Kuldesak with Ahmad Dhani. Once was later asked to join Dhani's band, Dewa 19, in 2000, and eventually replaced Ari Lasso, who was expelled from the group for drug use. In the beginning, Once had difficulty fulfilling fan's high expectations set by Lasso, and was noted as not communicating with them as well as having a stiff on-stage persona.

Once was eventually accepted by Dewa 19's fans after Bintang Lima, his first album with the group, was a hit; it eventually sold 1.7 million copies. He later recorded four more albums with Dewa 19. In 2004, Once had a hit single "Separuh Nafasku" ("Half of My Breath"). He also released three solo singles, "Dealova", "Aku Mau" ("I Want") and "Symphony yang Indah" ("A Beautiful Symphony").

On 19 January 2011, Once resigned from Dewa 19 to develop his solo career; it was rumored that problems with royalties were a factor in his decision.

Discography
Fargat 727

 Seribu Angan (1991)

Dewa 19

 Bintang Lima (2000)
 Cintailah Cinta (2002)
 Laskar Cinta (2004)
 Republik Cinta (2006)

Once (Solo Career)

 Once (2012)
 Intrinsik (2015)
 Sigma (2023)

Singles
 Anggun (1999)
 Dealova (2005)
 Kucinta Kau Apa Adanya (2007)

Awards
Voted Best Pop Soloist at the 2005 Anugerah Musik Indonesia (AMI). The following year, one of his songs was voted Best Pop Song at AMI.

Personal life
Once married Rietmadhanty Angelica Tauchid on 20 December 2005. They have one son which is Manuel Mekel.

References
Footnotes

Bibliography

External links
 

1970 births
Living people
Dewa 19 members
Indonesian songwriters
21st-century Indonesian male singers
Minahasa people
People from Makassar
Musicians from South Sulawesi
Anugerah Musik Indonesia winners
20th-century Indonesian male singers